The State Security Department or VSD is a Lithuanian intelligence agency which collects information on threats to the national security and works to eliminate those threats. The VSD also conducts counterintelligence, protects state secrets and classified information, and vets certain applicants for residence permits or entry to Lithuania.

History
The origins of the institution are in the Intelligence Unit established within the Lithuanian Armed Forces on 27 October 1918. The first head of the intelligence service was Jonas Žilinskas. In 1923, many intelligence activities were transferred to the Ministry of the Interior and the institution changed its name over the time. In 1933 it was re-organized into the State Security Department with the objective to suppress espionage activities. The last director of the service in the interwar period was Augustinas Povilaitis. In the aftermath of the Soviet invasion and occupation in 1940, he was arrested and executed by the Soviets.

The department was reestablished on 26 March 1990. At that time, the department was also responsible for certain aspects of law enforcement: providing protection to state officials and strategic objects, ensuring integrity of state communications network, investigating political corruption. Other agencies took over these extra duties and, during 2010, the mission of VSD was clarified to mainly focus on intelligence and counterintelligence.

Directors
Mečys Laurinkus (26 March 1990 – 19 March 1991)
Viktoras Zedelis (acting)
Zigmas Vaišvila (27 September 1991 – 19 March 1992)
Balys Gajauskas (22 April 1992 – 11 August 1992)
Petras Plumpa (11 August 1992 – 4 January 1993)
Jurgis Jurgelis (4 January 1993 – 3 June 1998)
Mečys Laurinkus (2nd time, 3 June 1998 – 30 April 2004)
Arvydas Pocius (30 April 2004 – 12 June 2007)
Povilas Malakauskas (12 June 2007 – 28 December 2009)
Romualdas Vaišnoras (acting)
Gediminas Grina (9 April 2010 – 13 April 2015)
Darius Jauniškis (14 April 2015 – present)

See also 
 Second Investigation Department

References

External links

Intelligence agencies
Counterintelligence agencies
Law enforcement agencies of Lithuania
1990 establishments in Lithuania
Government agencies established in 1990